The French Army is divided into arms (armes). Matériel is one of the arms of Land Army specialised in maintenance and repair of equipment or hardware (Materiel).

 Regiments
 1er régiment du matériel (1st RMAT) Woippy (57)
 2e régiment du matériel (2nd RMAT) Bruz (35)
 3e Régiment du Matériel (3rd RMAT) Muret (31)
 4e régiment du matériel (4th RMAT) Nîmes (30)
 5e régiment du matériel (5th RMAT) Strasbourg (67)
 6e régiment du matériel (6th RMAT) Besançon (25)
 7e régiment du matériel (7th RMAT) Lyon (69)
 8e régiment du matériel (8th RMAT) Mourmelon (51)
 9e Bataillon du matériel (9th BMAT) Poitiers (86)
 Bases
  5e base de soutien du matériel (5th BSMAT) Draguignan (83)
  12e base de soutien du matériel (12th BSMAT) Salbris (41)
  13e base de soutien du matériel (13th BSMAT) Clermont-Ferrand (63)
  14e Base de Soutien du Matériel (14th BSMAT) Poitiers (86)
  15e base de soutien du matériel (15th BSMAT) Phalsbourg (57)
 School
 École du matériel - Les Écoles Militaires de Bourges (EMB) Bourges (18)

See also 
 Military logistics

References 

Arms of the French Army
Military logistics of France